Sarangani, officially the Province of Sarangani (Maguindanaon: Dairat nu Sarangani, Jawi: دايرت نو سارڠني),  is a province in the Philippines located in the Soccsksargen region. Its capital is Alabel. With a  coastline along the Sarangani Bay and Celebes Sea, the province is at the southernmost tip of Mindanao island, and borders South Cotabato and Davao del Sur to the north, Davao Occidental to the east, and the Celebes Sea to the south.

Sarangani is part of the South Cotabato-Cotabato-Sultan Kudarat-Sarangani-General Santos development cluster, and is linked by paved roads to the international airport and harbor of General Santos.

The province is divided into two sections, separated by the Sarangani Bay and city of General Santos, and it used to be part of South Cotabato until it was made an independent province in 1992.

The General Santos Metropolitan Area or Metro General Santos is a metropolitan area encompassing the highly urbanized city of General Santos, The Regional Agro-Industrial Center of Alabel, the towns of Glan, Kiamba, Maasin, Maitum, Malapatan and Malungon and the formed out of neighboring provinces of South Cotabato adding Metro General Santos adding Lake Sebu, Polomolok, T'Boli and Tupi.

History
The earliest civilization in the province can be found in Maitum, Sarangani, where the Maitum Anthropomorphic Pottery or Maitum Jars were found. The jars have been dated to approximately 5 BC to 370 AD, one of the oldest in the entire Southeast Asian region and the Philippines. The discovery testified to the long history of cultural exchanges in Sarangani and its people.

The Sarangani was once part of Sultanate of Maguindanao. The establishment of the Sultanate in the area cause of more Maguindanaon settlers arrival. After fall of the Sultanate of Maguindanao as a great power in Mindanao, Datu Uto of Buayan expanded his domain towards Sarangani Bay. Sarangani would eventually be under the Sultanate of Buayan until the American era.

Sarangani Island (now part of Davao Occidental) was named  by the Spanish explorer Ruy López de Villalobos in 1543, in honor of Antonio de Mendoza y Pacheco, the viceroy of New Spain who had appointed López de Villalobos to lead an expedition to the Western Islands (now the Philippines) because of their relation by marriage.  The early inhabitants who first inhabited Sarangani were the indigenous natives, called MunaTo, a native term for "first people."

In 1942, the Japanese troops occupied Southern Cotabato. In 1945, Filipino troops of the 6th, 10th, 101st and 102nd Infantry Division of the Philippine Commonwealth Army and 10th Constabulary Regiment of the Philippine Constabulary entered in and liberated Southern Cotabato and fought against the Japanese Imperial Army forces during the Battle of Cotabato at the end of World War II under the Japanese Occupation.

Before its inception in 1992, Sarangani was part of South Cotabato as the Third District of South Cotabato. The province was created by Republic Act No. 7228 on March 16, 1992, penned by Congressman James L. Chiongbian. His wife, Priscilla L. Chiongbian, was the first Governor of Sarangani.

Geography
Sarangani covers a total area of  occupying the southern tip of the Soccsksargen in central Mindanao. The province is bordered on the central-north by South Cotabato, northeast by Davao del Sur, east by Davao Occidental, south by the Sarangani Bay and Celebes Sea, and northwest by Sultan Kudarat.

Sarangani is divided into two (eastern and western) sections, separated by the Sarangani Bay and General Santos in the middle. The western portion comprises the towns of Maitum, Kiamba, and Maasim, and is bounded on the north by South Cotabato and on the northwest by Sultan Kudarat. The eastern section consists of Alabel, Glan, Malapatan, and Malungon.

Administrative divisions
Sarangani comprises seven municipalities. A single legislative district encompasses all towns.

Demographics

Religion

Christianity is the  majority religion in the province with a total of 79% (48% Roman Catholicism and 31% evangelicals). Other religious minorities are Islam (9%)  and Iglesia ni Cristo (2%). The remainder is usually divided among other Christian churches.

Economy

Coconut, corn, rice, banana, mango, durian, rubber, and sugarcane are major crops now being planted by the inhabitants. 
The province has plantations (mango, banana, pineapple, asparagus), cattle ranches, and commercial fishponds that have been operating in the area, some of which having existed as far back as 40 years.

Electricity comes from the National Power Corporation, and augmented by a 50 MW power plant in Alabel, the province's capital. Water is provided for by sustainable spring development projects.

Government

Elected Officials 
 Rep. Steve Chiongbian Solon
Gov. Rogelio D. Pacquiao 
 Vice Gov. Elmer T. de Peralta
Elected Officials 
 Rep. Rogelio D. Pacquiao
 Gov. Steve Chiongbian Solon
 Vice Gov. Elmer T. de Peralta
Elected Officials 
 Rep. Rogelio D. Pacquiao
 Gov. Steve Chiongbian Solon
 Vice Gov. Elmer T. de Peralta

Elected Officials 
 Rep. Emmanuel "Manny" Pacquiao
 Gov. Steve Chiongbian Solon
 Vice Gov. Jinkee J. Pacquiao

Elected Officials 
 Rep. Emmanuel "Manny" Pacquiao
 Gov. Miguel Rene Angelo Dominguez
 Vice Gov. Steve Chiongbian Solon

Elected Officials 
 Rep. Erwin Chiongbian
 Gov. Miguel Angelo Dominguez
 Vice Gov. Steve Chiongbian Solon

Elected Officials 
 Rep. Erwin Chiongbian
 Gov. Miguel Angelo Dominguez
 Vice Gov. Bridget Chiongbian-Huang

Elected Officials 
 Rep. Erwin Chiongbian
 Gov. Miguel Escobar
 Vice Gov. Felipe Constantino

Elected Officials 
 Rep. Juan Domino*
 Gov. Priscilla Chiongbian
 Vice Gov. Miguel Escobar

Elected Officials 
 Rep. James Chiongbian(as Lone District of Sarangani)
 Gov. Priscilla Chiongbian
 Vice Gov. Miguel Escobar

Elected Officials 
 Rep. James Chiongbian (as Third District of South Cotabato)
 Gov. Priscilla Chiongbian
 Vice Gov. Miguel Escobar

Note

 *-Rep.Juan Domino was Disqualified due to a lack of Residency

Tourism
Sarangani celebrates its foundation anniversary every November, named as MunaTo Festival.

Sarangani has ancient burial jars, discovered by archaeologists from the National Museum in Ayub Cave in Maitum, in 1991 and in 2008, and at Sagel Cave in Maitum (now declared by National Historical Institute as a national historical site). Amid Mindanao's armed conflicts, artifacts found thereat prove settlements of pre-historic civilization in Maitum.

See also
Jinkee Pacquiao - wife of Manny Paquiao and former Sarangani vice governor (2013). Her family is from Sarangani.

References

External links 

 
 
 Official Website of the Provincial Government of Sarangani
 Local Governance Performance Management System

 
Provinces of the Philippines
Provinces of Soccsksargen
States and territories established in 1992
1992 establishments in the Philippines